Corporation Street is a tram stop on Line 1 of the West Midlands Metro serving Corporation Street, a major thoroughfare in Birmingham City Centre, England.

Government approval for the extension from Snow Hill to Grand Central was given on 16 February 2012. It was opened on 30 May 2016.

The stop only has a shelter on the northbound side. The southbound side has no shelter presumably because at the time it was the penultimate stop before the terminus at Grand Central.

Services
Mondays to Saturdays, Midland Metro services in each direction between Edgbaston and Wolverhampton St George's run at six to eight-minute intervals during the day, and at fifteen-minute intervals during the evenings and on Sundays.

References

External links
Midland Metro (Birmingham City Centre Extension Etc) Order - Inspector's Report

West Midlands Metro stops
Railway stations in Great Britain opened in 2016